Orthophytum gurkenii is a plant species in the genus Orthophytum.

The bromeliad is endemic to the Atlantic Forest biome (Mata Atlantica Brasileira)  within Minas Gerais state, located in southeastern Brazil.

Cultivars and hybrids 
Cultivars and hybrids include:
 Orthophytum 'Clouds'
 Orthophytum 'Hatsumi Maertz'
 Orthophytum 'Mother Lode'
 Orthophytum 'Stardust'
 Orthophytum 'Starlights'
 Orthophytum 'Warren Loose'

References
 

gurkenii
Endemic flora of Brazil
Flora of the Atlantic Forest
Flora of Minas Gerais